Night Fall in the Ti-Tree is a 1905 artist's book by Violet Teague and Geraldine Rede. It is about a family of rabbits and is known as the first Australian work using colour relief printing.

Publication history
1905, Australia, Sign of the Rabbit, Paperback
1906, England, Elkin Mathews, Paperback
1988, Australia, Australian National Gallery, Paperback

Collections
Night Fall is held in a number of gallery and library collections including:
Art Gallery of New South Wales (1905 ed.)
National Gallery of Australia (1905 ed.)
National Gallery of Victoria (1905 ed.)
Queensland Art Gallery (1905 ed.)
Art Gallery of Ballarat (1906 ed.)
Art Gallery of South Australia (1906 ed.)
Baillieu Library (1906 ed.) 
Boston Athenæum (1906 ed.)
James G. Nelson Library (Columbia University Libraries) (1906 ed.)
University of Delaware Library (1906 ed.)

References

1905 poems
1905 in art
1905 poetry books
1905 children's books
Australian poems
Australian poetry books
Australian children's books
Australian picture books
Children's poetry books
Artists' books
Books about rabbits and hares